In mathematics, a supersolvable arrangement is a  hyperplane arrangement which has a maximal flag with only modular elements.  Equivalently, the intersection semilattice of the arrangement is a 
supersolvable lattice, in the sense of Richard P. Stanley. As shown by Hiroaki Terao, 
a complex hyperplane arrangement is supersolvable if and only if its complement is fiber-type.

Examples include arrangements associated with Coxeter groups of type A and B.

It is known that the Orlik–Solomon algebra of a supersolvable  arrangement is a Koszul algebra; whether the converse is true is an open problem.

References

Discrete geometry
Matroid theory